Murdered by Morning is a television series on Oxygen that premiered in January 2020.

Episodes

See also

 2020 in American television

References

External links
 
 

2020 American television series debuts
2020 American television series endings
Oxygen (TV channel) original programming